The Haval H1 or formerly the Great Wall Haval M4 is a subcompact SUV produced by the Chinese manufacturer Great Wall. It was essentially a rebadged and lifted Great Wall Florid, until the second generation which is a rebadged Great Wall Voleex C20R. The Great Wall Haval M4 was renamed to simply Haval H1 after Great Wall launched Haval into an individual sub-brand in 2013.

First generation 

Based on the Great Wall Florid & Toyota Ist, the Great Wall Haval M4 has been launched on the Chinese car market in 2012. Price ranges from 63,900 to 71,900 yuan.

Malaysia 
The Great Wall Haval M4 was launched in Malaysia in July 2014 as the Great Wall M4 with three variants available: Standard, Comfort and Premium. All three variants could be had with either a manual or automatic gearbox. Early models were fully imported from China. Local assembly in Malaysia started in December 2014. The locally assembled models were officially available as of January 2015. In November 2015, the "Elite" add-on kit became available for the Premium variant. Differences included a new design for the halogen projector headlights with LED positioning lamps, a front grille with a hexagonal mesh design, 16-inch alloy wheels with different multi-spoke design, matte black vinyl wrap for the roof and red-black colour combo finish for the leather seats. As of early 2016, the Standard variant was dropped and it was rebranded into the Haval M4. As of early 2017, the manual transmission option was no longer available and the vehicle was again rebranded now into the Haval H1.

Gallery

Safety
The H1 for Africa received 2 stars for adult occupants and 2 stars for toddlers from Global NCAP in 2020 (similar to Latin NCAP 2013).

Second generation 

The second generation Haval H1 was launched on the Chinese car market. Price ranges from 68.900 yuan to 82.900 yuan. Debuting during the 2014 Chengdu Auto Show in China, the subcompact crossover is essentially a rebadged Great Wall Voleex C20R. The only engine available is a 1.5 liter four-cylinder petrol engine producing 106 hp and 138 nm, mated to a five-speed manual gearbox.

Gallery

References 

Mini sport utility vehicles
Great Wall Motors vehicles
Cars of China
Cars introduced in 2012
Crossover sport utility vehicles
Global NCAP small family cars
H1